Sybilla krahmeri is a species of longhorn beetle in the Cerambycinae subfamily. It was described by Cerda in 1973. It is known from Chile.

References

Bimiini
Beetles described in 1973
Endemic fauna of Chile